Andreas Castiglioni (born 2 May 1980) is an Italian luger who has competed since 1998. A natural track luger, he won the silver medal in the men's singles event at the 2005 FIL World Luge Natural Track Championships in Latsch, Italy.

Castiglioni also earned a silver in the men's singles event at the 2004 FIL European Natural Luge Natural Track Championships in Hüttau, Austria.

References 
 
 Natural track European Championships results 1970–2006
 Natural track World Championships results: 1979–2007

External links
 

1980 births
Italian male lugers
Living people
People from Merano